Spica is a genus of moths belonging to the subfamily Thyatirinae of the Drepanidae.

Species
 Spica luteola Swinhoe, 1889
 Spica parallelangula Alphéraky, 1893

References

Thyatirinae
Drepanidae genera